The following is the standings of the Iran Football's 1973–74 football season.

League standings

Group A

Group B

Final

Sepahan promoted to 1976–77 Takht Jamshid Cup

References

See also
 1974–75 Takht Jamshid Cup

League 2 (Iran) seasons
1973–74 in Asian second tier association football leagues
2